Zircon is a mineral and gemstone.

Zircon may also refer to:

Science and technology
 Zircon (microkernel), the microkernel of the operating system Google Fuchsia
 Cubic zirconia, a synthetic diamond substitute, sometimes mistakenly referred to as "zircon"

Military
 Zircon (satellite), a British signals intelligence satellite
 Zircon affair, an incident surrounding the British signals intelligence satellite
 USS Zircon (PY-16), a US Navy vessel
 3M22 Zircon, Russian hypersonic anti-ship cruise missile

Other uses
 Zircon (composer), American electronic musician Andrew Aversa
 Zircon, a character of the  Sailor Moon manga series
 Zircon, multiple fictional characters from the animated children's television show Steven Universe
Zircon, a character in Land of the Lustrous.